James "Jimmy" Ellis (born August 17, 1935) is an American blues musician.  He has a recording career that goes back to the mid 1960s. On more than one occasion he has played at the Dusk Til Dawn Blues Festivals. In the 1960s he did some recordings that were released on the Jewel, Space, Kris and Romark labels. The type of music he has recorded over the years ranges from blues and R&B to Psychedelic funk and in the 1970s soul music from that era.

Background
He was born in Foreman, Arkansas in 1935 into a farming community. His teenage years were spent in Seattle, Washington. In those years he was a member of the Mount Baker Baptist Church singing in the choir. He was asked by the Reverend F.F. Billups to join the group The Travelling Four to replace the group's baritone singer who had just left. By 1955 when he was around 20 years old the group broke up. He soon enlisted in the army. In the late 1950s he became more seriously involved in playing the guitar and with Tony Harris and Billy Marshall who were from The Travelling Four, he formed the Centuries. In 1964 and now a solo artist, he headed to Los Angeles, hoping to record and later that year his first record single was released. Later in 1964, he met  R&B songwriter 'Fats' Washington. Ellis  recorded a couple of singles that were released on Washington's Movin' label. Later he had a couple more singles released this time on the Ride label which was another one of Washington's.

1990s to 2000s
In the 1990s he appeared on stage with Peter Tork. In 1996, his Red, Hot & Blues album was released. It featured songs such as "Sweet Dreams", "Every Day's A Holiday With The Blues", "(I'm Your) Hoochie Coochie Man" and "Rainy Night In Georgia". Saxophonist Stemsy Hunter,  drummer Richard Martinez and singer Suzie Cappetta contributed to the album.

In 2013, a compilation album of his releases between 1963 and 1973 was released on Tramp Records. The album was called The Story Of Jimmy ‘Preacher’ Ellis.

Venues
In 2002, he appeared at the Topanga Canyon Blues Festival. In 2010, he played at a tribute concert for Blind Willie Johnson, marking the 65th anniversary of his death. Other venues he has played at is the Littlefield in Brooklyn.
Dusk Till Dawn
In August 2013 he appeared at the D.C. Minner’s 23rd Annual Rentiesville Dusk til Dawn Blues Festival.

In August 2015, he was at the Dusk 'til Dawn Blues Festival in Oklahoma.

Current
He currently resides in Texas.

Singles

Albums

Appears on

References

1935 births
African-American guitarists
American blues singers
American blues guitarists
American male guitarists
Blues musicians from Arkansas
Living people
People from Little River County, Arkansas
Singers from Arkansas
Guitarists from Arkansas
20th-century American guitarists
20th-century American male musicians
20th-century African-American musicians
21st-century African-American people